Sometimes I'm Happy, Sometimes I'm Blue was an LP album made by Jill Corey in 1957, released as catalog number CL 1095 by Columbia Records, reissued as a CD on November 25, 2003 by Collectables Records.

Track listing

Tracks added in the CD version
"Exactly Like You" (Jimmy McHugh/Dorothy Fields) 
"I Found a New Baby" (Jack Palmer/Spencer Williams) 
"My Reverie" (Larry Clinton) 
"Have I Told You Lately That I Love You" (Scotty Wiseman) 
"Have You Ever Been Lonely (Have You Ever Been Blue)" (George "Funky" Brown/Peter de Rose)
"Seems Like Old Times" (Carmen Lombardo/John Jacob Loeb)

References 

Jill Corey albums
Columbia Records albums
1957 albums